This is a list of diseases of Butterfly Flower (Schizanthus × wisetonensis).

Bacterial diseases

Fungal diseases

Nematodes, parasitic

Viral and viroid diseases

References
Common Names of Diseases, The American Phytopathological Society

Butterfly flower